Billie Dean Letts (née Gipson; May 30, 1938 – August 2, 2014) was an American novelist and educator. She was a professor at Southeastern Oklahoma State University.

Biography
Letts was born as Billie Dean Gipson in Tulsa, Oklahoma, the daughter of Virginia M. (née Barnes), a secretary, and William C. Gipson.

She married Dennis Letts, a professor and actor, in 1958. The couple had three children: Dana, Tracy (a playwright), and Shawn (a jazz musician/composer). Dennis Letts served as editor for his wife's novels. He died of lung cancer in Tulsa on February 22, 2008, aged 73.

Letts died in a Tulsa hospital from pneumonia on August 2, 2014, aged 76. She had recently been diagnosed with acute myeloid leukemia.

Novels
Where the Heart Is (1995)
The Honk and Holler Opening Soon (1998)
Shoot the Moon (2004)
Made in the U.S.A. (2008)

Awards and honors
1994 Walker Percy Award
1996 Oklahoma Book Award
1998 Oprah's Book Club – Best Novel nominee – Where the Heart Is

References

External links
Author interview: Billie Letts at Hachette Book Group USA
Interview With Billie Letts  (July 2004)

1938 births
2014 deaths
20th-century American novelists
21st-century American novelists
American women novelists
Writers from Tulsa, Oklahoma
Southeastern Oklahoma State University faculty
Deaths from pneumonia in Oklahoma
20th-century American women writers
21st-century American women writers
Novelists from Oklahoma
Deaths from leukemia
Deaths from cancer in Oklahoma
American women academics